Pelican Lake 191C is an Indian reserve of the Pelican Lake First Nation in Saskatchewan. It is 81 kilometres southeast of Meadow Lake.

References

Indian reserves in Saskatchewan
Pelican Lake First Nation